The Yanks Are Coming may refer to:

"The Yanks Are Coming", key phrase from 1917 American wartime patriotic song "Over There"
The Yanks Are Coming (1942 film), American World War II musical comedy
The Yanks Are Coming (1963 film), American World War I 45-minute feature documentary
"The Yanks Are Coming", April 22, 1974 episode of David L. Wolper Productions documentary TV series American Heritage